The following highways are numbered 70A:

United States
 U.S. Route 70A
 Illinois Route 70A (former)
Maryland Route 70A
 Nebraska Spur 70A
 New York State Route 70A (former)
 County Route 70A (Oneida County, New York)
 County Route 70A (Steuben County, New York)
 Oklahoma State Highway 70A